10 Years in Rage: The Anniversary Album is the ninth full-length album released by the German heavy metal band Rage in 1994. It contains new material and previously unreleased tracks from the band's long career, as well the re-recording of "Prayers of Steel", from Avenger's first album and a medley of Rage's fan favourite tunes. The album features guest appearances from all the musicians that had played in Rage. The album was remastered by Noise/Sanctuary in 2002 with five bonus tracks.

Track listing

Personnel 
Band members
Peter "Peavy" Wagner – vocals, bass, arrangements
Sven Fischer – guitars
Spiros Efthimiadis – guitars
Chris Ephthimiadis – drums

Additional musicians
Jochen Schroeder, Rudy Graf, Manni Schmidt, Thomas Grüning, Alf Meyerratken – guitars
Efthimios Efthimiadis – buzuki
Jörg Michael – drums

Production
Sven Conquest – producer, engineer, mixing
Eberhard Köhler – mastering
Karl-Ulrich Walterbach – executive producer

References 

Rage (German band) albums
1994 albums
Noise Records albums